is a single-member electoral district for the House of Representatives, the lower house of the National Diet of Japan. It covers Northern Yamanashi, namely the capital Kōfu (without the former municipalities of Nakamichi and Kamikuishiki), the cities of Yamanashi and Kōshū and the former town of Kasugai in today's Fuefuki City. As of September 2012, 218,115 voters were registered in the district, giving its voters one of the highest vote weights in the country.

Before the introduction of single-member districts in the 1990s, all of Yamanashi had formed one At-large district that elected five members to the House of Representatives. After the last House of Representatives election under the old system in 1993, Representatives from Yamanashi included Liberal Democrat Eiichi Nakao, Socialist Azuma Koshiishi and reformist Sakihito Ozawa. Nakao and Koshiishi contested the new 1st district in 1996: Nakao won. Koshiishi was elected to the Diet in the 1998 election to represent Yamanashi in the House of Councillors. In the 2000 Representatives election, Ozawa challenged Nakao and unseated him. He held onto the seat until 2012 when he joined the Japan Restoration Party and lost the district to Liberal Democratic newcomer Noriko Miyagawa, a former junior high school teacher.

List of representatives

Election results

References 

Yamanashi Prefecture
Districts of the House of Representatives (Japan)